Neripteron cornucopia is a species of freshwater snail, an aquatic gastropod mollusk in the family Neritidae, the nerites.

Distribution
Distribution of Neripteron cornucopia include Odisha state and West Bengal in India, Myanmar, Vietnam,  Mai Po Marshes Nature reserve in Hong Kong, Singapore Jambi province in Indonesia, and Japan. Records from Japan were incorrectly identified as Neripteron violaceum prior to 1997.

The type locality is "Hugli estuary at Fort William and Tolly’s Nullah", now in Kolkata. William Thomas Blanford also reported this species from Irrawaddy River delta from Bago, Myanmar in 1867. It was rediscovered from India after 180 years in 2017.

Description
Neripteron cornucopia was originally described under the name Neritina cornucopia by William Henry Benson in 1836. Benson' original text (the type description) in Latin and English reads as follows:

The color of the live snail is black or dark grayish with black outline.

The color of the shell is dark brown. The coloration has also purplish and greenish spiral bands. Algae or silt are on periostracum usually.

The width of the shell is 10–13 mm in India, 7.2-12.9 mm in Hong Kong, and 6–17 mm in Singapore. The height of the shell is 4.5-9.2 mm in Hong Kong. The length of the shell is 13-19.6 mm in India, up to 17.4 mm in Hong Kong, and 9–24 mm in Singapore.

The operculum has paucispiral nucleus with a small initial region.

The Radula was described and depicted by Huang in 1997.

There is X0 sex-determination system in Neripteron cornucopia: the diploid number of chromosomes (2n) is 27 in males and 28 in females (2n = 26 + XX (or XO)).

Neripteron violaceum (synonym: Neritina depressa) is similar species. Neripteron auriculatum is very similar to juveniles of Neripteron cornucopia.

Ecology
Neripteron cornucopia lives in intertidal mangroves. For example, Blanford collected them on stems of nipa palm Nypa fruticans. It lives in water on various substrates: on mud, on fallen leaves, on stones and under stones, on concrete.

References 
This article incorporates public domain text from the reference

External links
 Benson, W. H. (1836). Descriptive catalogue of a collection of land and fresh-water shells, chiefly contained in the Museum of the Asiatic Society. Journal of the Asiatic Society of Bengal. 5(59): 741–750
 Troschel, F. H. (1837). Neue Süßwasser-Conchylien aus dem Ganges. Archiv für Naturgeschichte. 3: 166–182.
 Souleyet (L.F.A.) (1842). Description de cinq nouvelles espèces de nérites fluviales provenant du voyage de la Bonite. Revue Zoologique par la Société Cuviérienne. (1842): 269-270
 Reeve, L. A. (1855-1856). Monograph of the genus Neritina. In: Conchologia Iconica, or, illustrations of the shells of molluscous animals, vol. 9, pls 1-37 and unpaginated text. L. Reeve & Co., London

Neritidae
Gastropods described in 1836
Taxa named by William Henry Benson